The Porto Alegre Metro (Portuguese: Metrô de Porto Alegre, commonly called Trem or Trensurb) is a transit system operated jointly by the federal government, the state government of Rio Grande do Sul and the city of Porto Alegre through the company Trensurb (Company of Urban Trains of Porto Alegre SA) in Brasil. It has 22 stations, totaling  of route, and carries about 175,000 users a day.

History 

The Line 1 of the subway built in Porto Alegre was started in 1980, linking the center of Porto Alegre to cities to the north of the metropolitan area, as Canoas, Esteio, Sapucaia do Sul, São Leopoldo and Novo Hamburgo. The choice of path was made to relieve the heavy traffic of highway BR-116, the only option before the construction of this line, which already had serious problems with the transit at the time.

Extensions 
In December 1997, the line was extended to Unisinos.

A  extension to São Leopoldo-Museum was added in November 2000, after two months of trial service.

Operations

System characteristics 

Lines

Airport connection people mover 

The line has been operational since August 2013. It is a part of the Porto Alegre Metro system so users do not need to purchase a separate ticket. The journey time is 90 seconds. Depending on demand, one or two vehicles (150 or 300 passengers), will operate at any one time. Cost of construction was R$37.8 million with demand projected at 7,700 passengers per day. In the period 1 May 2014 to 7 September 2014, following the introduction of fare collection, the service averaged 3,165 passengers per day with a peak of 4,134 on 5 September 2014.

This is the first commercial installation in the world of the Aeromovel design, an atmospheric railway technology first developed in Porto Alegre in the late 1970s.

Future expansion
Line 2 of the metro is proposed to consist of a  route from the city centre to Cachoeirinha, of which around half will be underground. In 2019, the estimated cost of the line was $2.9 billion.

Network Map

See also 
 List of metro systems
 Rapid transit in Brazil

References 

Metro
Rapid transit in Brazil
Underground rapid transit in Brazil
Transport in Rio Grande do Sul
Electric railways in Brazil
3000 V DC railway electrification